Adam Drgoň (born 16 February 1985) is a Slovak professional ice hockey player who currently plays with HK Poprad of the Slovak Extraliga.

Career
He had previously played for HC Slovan Bratislava, HC Dukla Senica, HK Trnava, Lausitzer Füchse, HK Martin, MHK Dolný Kubín, HK Dukla Michalovce, ŠHK 37 Piešťany, HC Košice, HK Dukla Trenčín and HKM Zvolen.

Career statistics

Regular season and playoffs

International

Awards and honors

References

External links

Living people
HC Slovan Bratislava players
HK 91 Senica players
HK Trnava players
Lausitzer Füchse players
MHC Martin players
MHK Dolný Kubín players
HK Dukla Michalovce players
ŠHK 37 Piešťany players
HC Košice players
HK Dukla Trenčín players
HKM Zvolen players
HK Poprad players
1985 births
Slovak ice hockey defencemen
Sportspeople from Trnava
Slovak expatriate ice hockey players in Germany